Balija is a caste of the Indian states of Andhra Pradesh, Telangana, Tamil Nadu, Karnataka, and Kerala.

Origins
Variations of the name in use in the medieval era were Balanja, Bananja, Bananju, Banajiga and Banijiga, with probable cognates Balijiga, Valanjiyar, Balanji, Bananji and derivatives such as Baliga, all of which are said to be derived from the Sanskrit term Vanik or Vanij, for trader.

Beginning in the 9th century, references are found in inscriptions throughout the Kannada and Tamil areas to a trading network, which is sometimes referred to as a guild, called the Five Hundred Lords of Ayyavolu that provided trade links between trading communities in Tamil Nadu and Karnataka. From the 13th century, inscriptions referring to "Vira Balanjyas" (warrior merchants) started appearing in the Andhra country. The Vira Balanjyas, whose origins are often claimed to lie in the Ayyavolu, represented long-distance trading networks that employed fighters to protect their warehouses and goods in transit. The traders were identified as nanadesi (of 'many countries') and as swadesi ('own country'). The terms balanjya-setti and balija were also used for these traders, and in later times naidu and chetti. These traders formed collectives called pekkandru and differentiated themselves from other collectives called nagaram, which probably represented Komati merchants. The pekkandru collectives also included members of other communities with status titles reddi, boya and nayaka. They spread all over South India, Sri Lanka, and also some countries in the Southeast Asia.

Rao et al. note that the Balijas included a configuration of castes representing a combination of the martial and the mercantile. They were mobilised politically by the Vijayanagara emperor Krishnadevaraya. Later, in the 15th and 16th centuries, they colonised the Tamil country and established Nayaka chieftaincies. At this time, Balija was often an umbrella term that, in addition to the Balija proper, included the Boyas, Gollas, Gavaras, and other castes. Cynthia Talbot believes that in Andhra the transformation of occupational descriptors into caste-based descriptors did not occur until at least the 17th century.

The classification of people as Balija was one of many challenges for the census enumerators of the British Raj era, whose desire was to reduce a complex social system to one of administrative simplicity using theories of evolutionary anthropology. Early Raj census attempts in Madras Presidency recorded a wide variety of people claiming to be members of Balija subcastes but who appeared to share little in common and thus defied the administrative desire for what it considered to be a rational and convenient taxonomy. Those who claimed to be Chetty had an obvious connection through their engagement in trade and those who called themselves Kavarai were simply using the Tamil word for Balija but, for example, the Linga based their claim to Balija status on a sectarian identification, the Gazula were bangle-makers by occupation, the Telaga had Telugu origins and the Rajamahendram also appeared to be a geographic claim based on their origins in the town of Rajahmundry. Subsequent attempts to rationalise the enumeration merely created other anomalies and caused upset.

Balija branches
There are numerous branches, sub-divisions or social groups which make up the larger Balija social group.

 Balija Chettis (or Chetti Balija): Mentioned in several Vijayanagar accounts as wealthy merchants who controlled powerful trading guilds. To secure their loyalty, the Vijayanagar kings made them Desais or "superintendents of all castes in the country." They were classified as right-hand castes. David Rudner claims that the Balija Chettis became a separate caste from the Balija Nayak warriors as recent as the 19th century; and accordingly they have closer kinship ties to the Nayak warriors than to Chetti merchants.
According to Kanakalatha Mukund, the Balija merchants of Tamil Nadu are called Kavarai. That is the Tamilised rendition of Gavara.
 Dasa Banajiga are also called as Jaina Kshatriya Ramanuja-Dasa Vaniyas and Sadu Banajiga as they were formerly Jain Kshatriyas who were converted into Vaishnavism by Ramanujacharya during the rein of Bitti Deva. They are mostly found in Channapatna near Bangalore. They are clean in their habits, pure vegetarians, follow the doctrines of Ramanujacharya, worship Vaishnava gods, speak Kannada, and cremate their dead.

Caste titles
Some Balijas use surnames such as Naidu or Nayudu, and Naicker, which share a common root. Nayaka as a term was first used during the Vishnukundina dynasty that ruled from the Krishna and Godavari deltas during the 3rd century AD. During the Kakatiya dynasty, the Nayaka title was bestowed to warriors who had received land and the title as a part of the Nayankarapuvaram system for services rendered to the court. The Nayaka was noted to be an officer in the Kakatiya court; there being a correlation between holding the Nayankara, the possession of the administrative title Angaraksha and the status title Nayaka.

A more widespread usage of the Nayaka title amongst the Balijas appears to have happened during the Vijayanagara empire where the Balija merchant-warriors rose to political and cultural power and claimed Nayaka positions.

Dynasties

The Vijayanagara empire was based on an expanding, cash-oriented economy enhanced by Balija tax-farming. Some Balija families were appointed to supervise provinces as Nayaks (governors, commanders) by the Vijayanagara kings, some of which are:

 Madurai Nayaks
 Tanjavur Nayaks
 Gingee Nayaks / Senji / Chenchi Nayakas, Thundeera
Chandragiri:Kasturi Nayadu and Peda Koneti Nayudu of the Vasarasi family belonged to the Balija caste.

Varna status
Velcheru Narayana Rao and Sanjay Subrahmanyam say that the emergence of left-hand caste Balijas as trader-warrior-kings was evidence in the Nayak period as a consequence of conditions of new wealth, produced by collapsing two varnas, Kshatriya and Vaishya, into one. Based on the brahmanical conceptualisation of caste during the British Raj period, Balijas were accorded the Shudra position. The fourfold Brahmanical varna concept has not been acceptable to non-Brahmin social groups and some of them challenged the authority of Brahmins who described them as shudras.

See also
Sanskritisation

Notes

References

Further reading
 
 
 
 
Caste politics in the North, West and South India before Mandal
 Konduru: structure and integration in a South Indian village, Paul G. Hiebert, pp. 21–22.
 The Warrior Merchants, Mittison Mines
Religion and Public Culture, John Jeya Paul

Social groups of Tamil Nadu
Indian castes
Social groups of Andhra Pradesh
Social groups of Karnataka